Namanarayani (pronounced ) is a rāgam in Carnatic music (musical scale of South Indian classical music). It is the 50th Melakarta rāgam in the 72 melakarta rāgam system of Carnatic music. It is called Nāmadēshi in Muthuswami Dikshitar school of Carnatic music.

Structure and Lakshana

It is the 2nd rāgam in the 9th chakra Brahma. The mnemonic name is Brahma-Sri. The mnemonic phrase is sa ra gu mi pa dha ni. Its  structure (ascending and descending scale) is as follows (see swaras in Carnatic music for details on below notation and terms):
: 
: 
(this scale uses the notes shuddha rishabham, antara gandharam, prati madhyamam, shuddha dhaivatham, kaisiki nishadham)

As it is a melakarta rāgam, by definition it is a sampoorna rāgam (has all seven notes in ascending and descending scale). It is the prati madhyamam equivalent of Vakulabharanam, which is the 14th melakarta.

Janya rāgams 
Namanarayani has a few minor derived scales (janya rāgams) associated with it. See List of janya rāgams for full list of scales associated with Namanarayani and other melakarta rāgams.

Compositions
A few compositions set to Namanarayani scale are:

Paga Seya Thaguna by Walajapet Venkataramana Bhagavathar
En maname by Koteeswara Iyer
Narmada kaveri by Muthuswami Dikshitar
Mahadeva pahimam by Dr. M. Balamuralikrishna
Namanarayana ananyarha by Sriman N.Ch.Krishnamacharyulu

Related rāgams
This section covers the theoretical and scientific aspect of this rāgam.

Namanarayani's notes when shifted using Graha bhedam, yields no other melakarta rāgam. Graha bhedam is the step taken in keeping the relative note frequencies same, while shifting the shadjam to the next note in the rāgam.

Notes

References

Melakarta ragas